Regut  is a village in the administrative district of Gmina Celestynów, within Otwock County, Masovian Voivodeship, in east-central Poland. It is close to National Road 50.

The village has an approximate population of 590. It is home to the sports club RKS Bór Regut. From 1975 to 1998 the village was in Warsaw Voivodeship, which is now part of Masovian Voivodeship.

External links
 Jewish Community in Regut on Virtual Shtetl

References

Regut